Mokhdan or Makhdan may refer to the following places in Iran:
 Mokhdan, Deyr
 Mokhdan, Bord Khun, Deyr County
 Makhdan, Tangestan